Lillian Adams (May 13, 1922 – May 25, 2011) was an American actress who appeared in over 100 film and television roles.

Born in Chicago, Adams appeared in movies such as Private Benjamin and Bruce Almighty as well as television series such as Gomer Pyle: USMC, The Twilight Zone, Archie Bunker's Place, Married... with Children, NYPD Blue, Frasier, and Modern Family.  Her last film project was an independent film titled At What Price.

Adams also appeared in commercials for CVS Pharmacy as the mascot Super Saver Lillian.

On May 25, 2011, Adams died of heart failure in Woodland Hills, California, aged 89.

Selected filmography

 Crisis (1950) as Nurse
 Whirlybirds (1958, TV Series) as Drugstore Clerk
 The Wild and the Innocent (1959) as Kiri Hawks
 Tormented (1960) as Mrs. Ellis
 A Majority of One (1961) as Mrs. Stein
 Hemingway's Adventures of a Young Man (1962) as Indian Woman
 The Outer Limits (1963, Episode: "Nightmare") as Dix's Mother
 A Very Special Favor (1965) as Therapy Group Member
 Family Affair (1966, TV series) as Mrs. Mariani
 Enter Laughing (1967) as Theater Goer
 Dragnet 1967 (1968, TV series) as Mother Maria, Gypsy con artist
 Funny Girl (1968) as Pushcart Woman
 Ironside (1969, TV series) as Mrs. Farber
 The Comic (1969) as Old Lady
 Pate Katelin en Buenos Aires (1969)
 Adam-12 (1971, TV series) as Mrs. Fine
 Heavy Traffic (1973) as voice of Rosa
 Lepke (1975) as Mama Meyer
 Half a House (1975) as Bitsy's client
 An Enemy of the People (1978)
 Swap Meet (1979) as Woman
 The Last Word (1979) as Information Lady
 The Jerk (1979) as Tillie
 The Hunter (1980) as Blumenthal's Secretary
 Private Benjamin (1980) as Mrs. Goodman
 Archie Bunker's Place (1981, TV series) as Mrs. Plotkin
 Hey Good Lookin' (1982) as voice of Italian Woman
 Hambone and Hillie (1983) as Estelle
 Summer School (1987) as Grandma Eakian
 Out of This World (1988, TV series) as Evie
 Murphy Brown (1992, TV series) as Estelle
 Unstrung Heroes (1995) as Aunt Estelle
 Night Stand (1995-1997, TV series) as Ruthie / Pamela 
 Wings (1997, TV series) as Older Lady
 Temporarily Yours (1997, TV series) as Passenger #1 
 Hang Time (1997, TV series) as The Russian Woman
 Mike Hammer, Private Eye (1997, TV series) as Mrs. Dominic
 Foreign Correspondents (1999) as Sonya
 Becker (1999, TV series) as Mrs. Rowick
 Dharma & Greg (1999, TV series) as Mrs. Spinoza
 Anywhere but Here (1999) as Jack's Mother
 Magnolia (1999) as Donnie's Old Neighbor
 Attention Shoppers (2000) as Gracie
 Little Nicky (2000) as Old Lady at Game
 Dean Quixote (2000) as University Teller
 The Sweetest Thing (2002) as Aunt Frida
 Kiss the Bride (2002) as Aunt Speed
 Malcolm in the Middle (2002-2006, TV series) as Mona
 Today I Vote for My Joey (2002) as Selma
 Bruce Almighty (2003) as Mama Kowolski
 Love for Rent (2005) as Mrs. Goldfarb
 The TV Set (2006) as Audience Member #2
 It's Always Sunny in Philadelphia (2007, Episode: "The Gang Sets Sweet Dee on Fire") as Irvine Simon
 Ugly Betty (2007, TV series) as Esther
 Bar Starz (2008) as Crazy Old Lady
 The Suite Life on Deck (2008-2009, TV series) as Mrs. Pepperman
 Two and a Half Men (2009, TV series) as Mrs. Freemantle
 Tanner Hall (2009) as Victoria's Grandmother
 Modern Family (2009, Episode: "Pilot") as Passenger on Plane
 Tim and Eric's Billion Dollar Movie (2012) as Mrs. Wareheim

References

External links

 
 
 

1922 births
2011 deaths
Actresses from Chicago
American television actresses
20th-century American actresses
21st-century American actresses
American film actresses